Kara Koby (Kor-Kobı) is a rural locality (a selo) in Ongudaysky District, the Altai Republic, Russia. The population was 244 as of 2016. There are 5 streets.

Geography 
Kara Koby is located 46 km west of Onguday (the district's administrative centre) by road. Yelo and Tenga are the nearest rural localities.

References 

Rural localities in Ongudaysky District